Barnwal (also spelled Baranwal, Burnwal, Varnwal, Warnwal or Barnawal) is a part of the larger Bania community of northern India.

The community mostly resides in the regions of Etawah, Azamgarh, Gorakhpur, Kushinagar, Deoria, Ghazipur, Bihar, Jharkhand, and West Bengal

References

Social groups of Uttar Pradesh
Social groups of Haryana
Social groups of Rajasthan
Social groups of Bihar
Bania communities
People from Bulandshahr
Indian surnames
Surnames of Indian origin
Surnames of Hindustani origin